Anatoli Hryhorovych Radenko (born 3 August 1959) is a former Ukrainian professional football coach and player. In the 2000s, he retired from football and became a priest.

Honours
 Soviet Top League runner-up: 1979.
 Soviet Cup finalist: 1982.

References

External links
 Career summary by KLISF

1959 births
Living people
Sportspeople from Donetsk
Soviet footballers
Soviet expatriate footballers
Expatriate footballers in Finland
Soviet expatriate sportspeople in Finland
FC Shakhtar Donetsk players
FC Shakhtar-2 Donetsk players
FC Pivdenstal Yenakiyeve players
FC Zimbru Chișinău players
FC Zorya Luhansk players
FC Volyn Lutsk players
Soviet Top League players
Ukrainian footballers
Ukrainian football managers
FC Volyn Lutsk managers
FC Sokol Saratov managers
FC Oleksandriya managers
FC Podillya Khmelnytskyi managers
FC Nyva Vinnytsia managers
Association football midfielders
Ukrainian expatriate football managers
Expatriate football managers in Russia
Ukrainian expatriate sportspeople in Russia
TP-47 players